Tags is a Unicode block containing formatting tag characters. The block is designed to mirror ASCII. It was originally intended for language tags, but has now been repurposed as emoji modifiers, specifically for region flags.

Legacy use 

U+E0001, U+E0020–U+E007F were originally intended for invisibly tagging texts by language but that use is no longer recommended.
All of those characters were deprecated in Unicode 5.1.

With the release of Unicode 8.0, U+E0020–U+E007E are no longer deprecated characters.
The change was made "to clear the way for the potential future use of tag characters for a purpose other than to represent language tags".
Unicode states that "the use of tag characters to represent language tags in a plain text stream is still a deprecated mechanism for conveying language information about text".

Current use 
With the release of Unicode 9.0, U+E007F is no longer a deprecated character. (U+E0001 LANGUAGE TAG remains deprecated.) The release of Emoji 5.0 in May 2017 considers these characters to be emoji for use as modifiers in special sequences.

The only usage specified is for representing the flags of regions, alongside the use of Regional Indicator Symbols for national flags. These sequences consist of  followed by a sequence of tags corresponding to the region as coded in the CLDR, then . For example, using the tags for "gbeng" (🏴󠁧󠁢󠁥󠁮󠁧󠁿) will cause some systems to display the flag of England, those for "gbsct" (🏴󠁧󠁢󠁳󠁣󠁴󠁿) the flag of Scotland, and those for "gbwls" (🏴󠁧󠁢󠁷󠁬󠁳󠁿) the flag of Wales.

The tag sequences are derived from ISO 3166-2, but sequences representing other subnational flags (for example US states) are also possible using this mechanism. However, as of Unicode version 12.0 only the three flag sequences listed above are "Recommended for General Interchange" by the Unicode Consortium, meaning they are "most likely to be widely supported across multiple platforms".

Unicode block

History
The following Unicode-related documents record the purpose and process of defining specific characters in the Tags block:

References 

Unicode blocks
Representations of flags